Corneliu Ionescu ( February 20, 1956) is a Romanian painter, famous for his ballerinas.

He was born in Pitești, Argeș County. He attended the Bucharest National University of Arts in the class of Gheorghe Șaru. He was trained by the painters Sorin Ilfoveanu, Zamfir Dumitrescu, Gheorghe Șaru, Ștefan Câlția.

Images

References

Bibliography 

 Corneliu Ostahie - Martor vizual, Editura Detectiv - Artă, București, 2013, 
 Enciclopedia artiștilor români contemporani, Editura Arc, București, Volumul III, 2000,

External links
 Corneliu Ostahie, The show monotony painting Cornelius Ionescu
 Web site - Corneliu Ionescu

1956 births
People from Pitești
Romanian painters
Living people
Bucharest National University of Arts alumni
Recipients of the Order of Cultural Merit (Romania)